Lengyel is a Hungarian surname (meaning Pole). It may refer to:
 Árpád Lengyel, Hungarian swimmer
 Balázs Lengyel, Hungarian literary critic
 Balázs Lengyel, Hungarian fencer
 Cornel Lengyel, American poet
 Dániel Lengyel, Hungarian footballer
 Félix Lengyel, Canadian Twitch streamer and former professional Overwatch player
 Gyula Lengyel, Hungarian politician
 Imre Lengyel, Hungarian diver
 Jack Lengyel, American football coach
 Joseph L. Lengyel, United States Air Force officer
 Levente Lengyel, Hungarian chess player
 Melchior Lengyel, Hungarian writer
 Olga Lengyel, Hungarian author and Holocaust survivor
 Roman Lengyel, Czech footballer
 Zoltán Lengyel, Hungarian politician

References

Hungarian-language surnames